Wednesday is an American coming-of-age supernatural comedy horror television series based on the character Wednesday Addams by Charles Addams. Created by Alfred Gough and Miles Millar, it stars Jenna Ortega as the titular character, with Gwendoline Christie, Riki Lindhome, Jamie McShane, Hunter Doohan, Percy Hynes White, Emma Myers, Joy Sunday, Georgie Farmer, Naomi J. Ogawa, Christina Ricci, and Moosa Mostafa appearing in supporting roles. Four out of the eight episodes are directed by Tim Burton, who also serves as executive producer. It revolves around Wednesday Addams, who attempts to solve a monster mystery at her new school.

Burton was previously approached to direct the 1991 film and was involved with a cancelled stop-motion animated The Addams Family film. In October 2020, he was reported to be helming a television series, which was later given a series order by Netflix. Ortega was cast in part to represent the character's Latina heritage. Ricci, who had played the titular character in the 1991 film and its 1993 sequel, was asked by Burton to join the series in a supporting role. Filming took place in Romania between September 2021 and March 2022.

Wednesday premiered on November 16, 2022, and was released on Netflix on November 23 to predominantly positive reviews from critics, who praised Ortega's performance. Within three weeks of release, it became the second-most watched English-language Netflix series. It received two Golden Globe nominations: Best Television Series – Musical or Comedy and Best Actress – Television Series Musical or Comedy for Ortega. In January 2023, the series was renewed for a second season.

Premise
Wednesday Addams is expelled from her school after dumping live piranhas into the school's pool in retaliation for the boys' water polo team bullying her brother Pugsley. Consequently, her parents Gomez and Morticia Addams enroll her at their high school alma mater Nevermore Academy, a private school for monstrous outcasts, in the town of Jericho, Vermont. Wednesday's cold, emotionless personality and her defiant nature make it difficult for her to connect with her schoolmates and cause her to run afoul of the school's principal Larissa Weems. However, she discovers she has inherited her mother's psychic abilities which allow her to solve a local murder mystery.

Cast and characters

Main

 Jenna Ortega as Wednesday Addams, a teenager who possesses psychic powers. She is sent to Nevermore Academy for causing mischief at several other schools. Ortega also plays Goody Addams, Wednesday's deceased ancestor whom Wednesday sees in visions of the past.
 Karina Varadi portrays a young Wednesday
 Gwendoline Christie as Larissa Weems, the shapeshifting principal of Nevermore Academy and a former student who was Morticia Addams's roommate
 Oliver Wickham portrays a young Larissa Weems
 Riki Lindhome as Dr. Valerie Kinbott, Wednesday's therapist from the local town, Jericho
 Jamie McShane as Donovan Galpin, Jericho's sheriff who is suspicious of Nevermore Academy and Wednesday specifically
 Ben Wilson portrays a young Donovan Galpin
 Hunter Doohan as Tyler Galpin, a Hyde barista at a local coffee shop and Sheriff Galpin's son who has a romantic interest in Wednesday
 Percy Hynes White as Xavier Thorpe, a student of Nevermore Academy who has the ability to make his art come to life
 Emma Myers as Enid Sinclair, Wednesday's colorful werewolf roommate at Nevermore Academy who attempts to become her friend despite Wednesday's lack of interest
 Joy Sunday as Bianca Barclay, a successful siren student at Nevermore Academy and Xavier's ex-girlfriend
 Georgie Farmer as Ajax Petropolus, a gorgon student at Nevermore Academy who is Enid's crush
 Naomi J. Ogawa as Yoko Tanaka, a vampire student at Nevermore Academy
 Moosa Mostafa as Eugene Ottinger, a student at Nevermore Academy who has the ability to control bees
 Christina Ricci as Marilyn Thornhill / Laurel Gates, the botany teacher at Nevermore Academy and dorm mother of Wednesday and Enid who is secretly revealed as Joseph Crackstone's descendant and Garrett's sister.

Recurring

 Victor Dorobantu as Thing, a sentient disembodied hand and relative of Wednesday who is sent by Wednesday's parents to watch over her at Nevermore Academy
 Luyanda Unati Lewis-Nyawo as Ritchie Santiago, a deputy of Sheriff Galpin
 Tommie Earl Jenkins as Noble Walker, the mayor and former sheriff of Jericho
 Ismail Kesu portrays a young Noble Walker
 Iman Marson as Lucas Walker, Noble Walker's son, whose group of friends often runs afoul of Wednesday

Guest

 Catherine Zeta-Jones as Morticia Addams, Wednesday's mother who attended Nevermore Academy when she was younger and possesses psychic powers similar to her daughter's
 Gwen Jones portrays a young Morticia Addams
 Luis Guzmán as Gomez Addams, Wednesday's father who also attended Nevermore Academy and is a suspected murderer
 Lucius Hoyos portrays a young Gomez Addams
 Isaac Ordonez as Pugsley Addams, Wednesday's younger brother
 George Burcea as Lurch, the Addams family's butler
 Calum Ross as Rowan Laslow, a student at Nevermore Academy who possesses telekinetic powers and causes trouble for Wednesday
 William Houston as Joseph Crackstone, a Pilgrim and Jericho's founding father who is intent on killing all outcasts that is Laurel's ancestor.
 Nitin Ganatra as Dr. Anwar, a mortician who works at Jericho's mortuary
 Lewis Hayes as Garett Gates, a teenager who Gomez is suspected to have murdered during his time at Nevermore Academy and was Laurel's brother
 Fred Armisen as Uncle Fester, Wednesday's paternal uncle who possesses electrokinesis powers, the ability to generate static electricity

Episodes

Production

Development
During pre-production on the 1991 film, Tim Burton was approached to direct, but ended up passing on it due to scheduling conflicts with Batman and Batman Returns, resulting in Barry Sonnenfeld taking the job. In March 2010, it was announced that Illumination Entertainment had acquired the underlying rights to the Addams Family drawings. The film was planned to be a stop-motion animated film based on Charles Addams's original drawings. Burton was set to co-write, co-produce, and possibly direct the film. In July 2013, it was reported that the film was cancelled, which, according to Burton, was due to the studio favoring a computer-animated approach over the stop-motion technique.

Showrunners Miles Millar and Alfred Gough started developing story ideas in 2019. They subsequently acquired the rights to the intellectual property before writing a pilot script, which they sent to Burton. To their surprise, Burton immediately became interested upon receiving the script. Commenting about his decision to join the project, Burton stated that he could relate to the titular character's worldview and that the script "spoke to me about how I felt in school and how you feel about your parents, how you feel as a person. It gave the Addams Family a different kind of reality. It was an interesting combination." Millar stated that it was "very important" to the creative team not to emulate the prior films and 1964 television series. Millar and Gough decided to make the juxtaposition of "outcasts" and "normies", as well as criticism of colonial Americans, major themes in the series.

In October 2020, Wednesday was initially announced as an unnamed Addams Family project being helmed by Burton. The series's production would be handled by MGM Television, with Burton as director. Gough and Millar would serve as showrunners, while Gough, Millar, and Burton would also be executive producers alongside Gail Berman, Jon Glickman, and Andrew Mittman. In February 2021, Netflix gave the production a series order consisting of eight episodes. In August 2021, Kayla Alpert was added as an executive producer and 1.21, Tee and Charles Addams Foundation, and Glickmania were also producing the series. Deemed his "first real foray into television", Burton directed four out of the eight episodes, with Gandja Monteiro and James Marshall directing the remaining episodes. Burton brought on regular collaborator Colleen Atwood as costume designer.

Casting

The creative team sought a Latina to play the role of Wednesday Addams in order to align with character Gomez Addams's heritage, an aspect of the character that was already worked into the series' script. In May 2021, Jenna Ortega, who is of Mexican and Puerto Rican descent, was cast in the role. Millar stated that, upon their first Zoom call together, the creative team knew that "nobody else on this planet" was better suited to portray the character. Ortega said that she was initially hesitant about joining the project due to her past work in teen-oriented Disney Channel shows and her plans to prioritize film over television work, but decided to join in after meeting Burton through Zoom. In the beginning of August of that year, Luis Guzmán was cast to guest-star as Gomez Addams, and Catherine Zeta-Jones was cast as Morticia Addams in an undisclosed capacity. Later that month, Thora Birch, Riki Lindhome, Jamie McShane, Hunter Doohan, Georgie Farmer, Moosa Mostafa, Emma Myers, Naomi J. Ogawa, Joy Sunday, and Percy Hynes White were announced to be cast as series regulars. Myers initially auditioned for the titular role before she was cast as Wednesday's roommate Enid.

In September, Gwendoline Christie and Victor Dorobantu were added to the cast in starring roles while Isaac Ordonez, George Burcea, Tommie Earl Jenkins, Iman Marson, William Houston, Luyanda Unati Lewis-Nyawo, Oliver Watson, Calum Ross, and Johnna Dias Watson were cast in recurring roles. In December 2021, Birch left the series, leaving the status of her character, dorm mother Tamara Novak, unclear. In March 2022, it was announced that Christina Ricci, who played Wednesday Addams in the 1991 film and its 1993 sequel, was cast as a series regular, replacing Birch in a similar role. Commenting on her casting, Ricci stated, "I was really flattered to be asked and to be asked by Tim [Burton]", with whom she had previously collaborated on the 1999 film Sleepy Hollow. Ricci was almost unable to accept the role due to possible scheduling conflicts with Showtime series Yellowjackets. In October, a trailer revealed Fred Armisen to be portraying Uncle Fester, and Ricci's role was confirmed as Marilyn Thornhill.

Filming
Filming took place between September 2021 and March 2022 in the Southern Carpathian town of Bușteni, Romania. Filming locations included Cantacuzino Castle, serving as the setting for the fictional Nevermore Academy, Politehnica University of Bucharest, Sinaia railway station, the Bucharest Botanical Garden, Monteoru House, and the historic Olga Greceanu Mansion in Dâmbovița County, standing in for the Gates mansion. Exterior shots of Cantacuzino Castle were supplemented with CGI. Other settings, including the entire town of Jericho, were constructed at Buftea Studios. Production designer Mark Scruton based his set design primarily on Charles Addams's original cartoons and drew inspiration from Burton-directed films such as Beetlejuice and Charlie and the Chocolate Factory. Ortega called her work on the series "very stressful and confusing" and "the most overwhelming job I've ever had" due to the production's fast-tracked shooting schedule.

To prepare for her role, Ortega learned to play cello and took canoeing, fencing, archery, and German lessons. According to actress Joy Sunday, the canoeing lessons were especially strenuous, involving the entire cast and some dozen stuntmen racing each other for an hour daily, with days starting as early as 5:30 am. Ortega avoided talking to Ricci about playing the character during filming in order to achieve her own unique rendition of the role. She choreographed her dance to the Cramps' "Goo Goo Muck" herself, taking inspiration from Siouxsie Sioux, Bob Fosse, and goth dance club footage from the 1980s. Ortega sought to make Wednesday's characterization consistent, down to changing lines that she felt were unfitting of the character, and with more depth, as "you can’t lead a story and have no emotional arc because then it’s boring and nobody likes you." Scenes featuring Thing, played by Romanian magician Victor Dorobantu, were achieved using a mixture of practical and special effects; Dorobantu wore a blue chroma-key bodysuit that would be edited out in post-production, leaving only his hand exposed. To create the illusion of a severed hand, a prosthetic stump was applied to Dorobantu's hand.

Music
In December 2021, it was reported that longtime Burton collaborator Danny Elfman joined the series to compose the original theme and co-compose its score with Chris Bacon. The score features a selection of the series's original score composed by Elfman and Bacon as well as several pop songs, including cello renditions of "Paint It Black" by the Rolling Stones, "Nothing Else Matters" by Metallica, and "Physical" by Dua Lipa. The score also incorporates a number of classical works, including The Four Seasons by Antonio Vivaldi, Edward Elgar's Cello Concerto, The Carnival of the Animals by Camille Saint-Saëns, Gnossienne No. 1 by Erik Satie, and "Flight of the Bumblebee" by Nikolai Rimsky-Korsakov.

Led by two singles, Wednesdays 48-track soundtrack was released by Lakeshore Records on November 23, 2022, and a four-track extended play featuring covers of classical and pop songs was released on November 30. In his review of the series, Tony Sokol of Den of Geek called the score "a major character, not only thematically, but as an emotional delivery system", making "the chills creepier, the jokes funnier, and the tingles tangible". Linda Codega of Gizmodo called the cello segments "memorable" and the score "occasionally-magnificent". Writing for IGN, Amelia Emberwing described the combination of Elfman's score with Burton's material as "[going] together like peanut butter and jelly" and the score overall as "a stunner".

Release
A first teaser trailer for Wednesday was released on August 17, 2022, followed by a full trailer on October 9 and the unveiling of the series's opening sequence on November 8. Wednesday premiered on November 16, 2022, at Hollywood Legion Theater in Los Angeles. Its eight episodes were released on Netflix on November 23, 2022. In December 2022, Netflix released a promotional video to its Twitter account depicting Thing, a sentient disembodied hand appearing in the series, roaming the streets of New York City and capturing passersby's reactions.

Reception

Audience viewership
According to data from users of TV Time collected by Whip Media, Wednesday had the second-most pre-release followers of any Netflix original series on the platform, behind only The Witcher; it ultimately debuted at number one on Netflix in 83 countries. The series holds the record of most hours viewed in a week for an English-language Netflix series with a total 341.2 million hours watched in its first week of release, amounting to more than 50 million households, and passing prior record holder Stranger Things 4s 335.01 million hours. Nielsen Media Research reported a combined watch time of 6 billion minutes within its first week of release, making it the second-biggest streaming week ever recorded by the firm. Three weeks after its release, it became the second-most watched English-language Netflix series in the history of the platform, reaching an estimated 150 million households and totaling 1.02 billion viewing hours. Jacob Stolworthy of The Independent called the series's popularity "unprecedented" and suggested that it could jumpstart development of several other spin-off television series.

Critical response
The review aggregator website Rotten Tomatoes reported a 71% approval rating and an average rating of 6.8/10, based on 96 reviews. The website's critics consensus reads, "Wednesday isn't exactly full of woe for viewers, but without Jenna Ortega in the lead, this Addams Family-adjacent series might as well be another CW drama." Metacritic, which uses a weighted average, assigned a score of 66 out of 100 based on 26 critics, indicating "generally favorable reviews".

Ed Power of The Daily Telegraph gave Wednesday four out of five stars and called it "an addictively rococo romp that unfolds like a cross between Euphoria and Hotel Transylvania". John Anderson of The Wall Street Journal commended Ortega's "charismatic performance" and called the series "often delightful, despite its deliberate darkness". In his "B"-review for The Detroit News, Tom Long deemed the series visually appealing and described Ortega's deadpan as "just as elastic as it needed to be" and her performance overall as "consistently [pushing] outside the caricature enough to keep things lively". Writing for RogerEbert.com, Cristina Escobar similarly praised Ortega's deadpan humor and commended the series's "satisfactory" ending. While finding that the series would not be "what real fans of Charles Addams and his characters are looking for", Mike Hale of The New York Times called the series "tolerable" despite "satisfying only on the level of formulaic teenage romance and mystery" and compared it to the Harry Potter franchise. Commenting on its tone, Jesse Hassenger of TheWrap described the four episodes directed by Burton as feeling more like Veronica Mars than Sleepy Hollow. Nick Hilton of The Independent gave the series two out of five stars and criticized the series's tone as "relentlessly quippy Gen Z" and its performances as "more two-dimensional than the New Yorker comic strip in which the characters first appeared".

Accolades

Future
On possible future seasons, Gough and Millar commented in an interview with Variety, "when we sit down to create a show, it's looking at multiple seasons, ideally. That's never expected, but that's the anticipation that hopefully the show is successful." They further stated that they had "a pretty clear runway" of how future seasons could unfold. Preparations for a second season commenced in December 2022, following Amazon's acquisition of Metro-Goldwyn-Mayer. In January 2023, the series was renewed for a second season.

In popular culture
Following the release of Wednesday, Wednesday Addams's dance from the series and its fan recreations to Lady Gaga's song "Bloody Mary" went viral on video sharing service TikTok, with Kim Kardashian, Amelia Dimoldenberg, Marina Diamandis, Madonna and Gaga herself also participating in the trend. This resulted in a large increase in plays of the song on Spotify and on-demand streams in the United States, surging by 415 percent in the week after the series's release. Russian figure skater Kamila Valieva recreated the dance during a December 2022 competition. Earlier that same month, "Bloody Mary" was sent to French radio as a single, 11 years after the release of Born This Way, the album it was featured on. The 1981 song "Goo Goo Muck" by the Cramps, which plays during the original dance scene in the fourth episode of the series, also saw a surge in popularity. According to Billboard, on-demand streams of the song in the United States increased from 2,500 to over 134,000, and Spotify streams increased by 9,500 percent since the series was released. Janelle Zara of The Guardian stated that the viral dance trend "may have single-handedly revived Gothic subculture for Gen Z".

References

External links
 
 

2020s American high school television series
2020s American horror comedy television series
2022 American television series debuts
The Addams Family television series
American fantasy television series
Coming-of-age television shows
Dark fantasy television series
English-language Netflix original programming
English-language television shows
Fiction about curses
Ghosts in television
Gothic television shows
Mermaids in television
Murder in television
Fiction about secret societies
Television series about bullying
Television series about families
Television series about teenagers
Television series about werewolves
Television series by MGM Television
Television series created by Alfred Gough
Television series created by Miles Millar
Television shows about precognition
Television shows about telekinesis
Television shows based on comic strips
Television shows filmed in Romania
Television shows set in Vermont
Vampires in television
Witchcraft in television
Witch hunting in fiction
Works by Tim Burton
Zombies in television